The Third Republic of Venezuela is the reestablished Republic of Venezuela declared by Simón Bolívar in the year 1817, during the Venezuelan War of Independence. The Republic ended after the Congress of Angostura of 1819 decreed the union of Venezuela with New Granada, to form the republic of Gran Colombia.

Venezuela would become once again an independent republic after its separation from Gran Colombia in 1830, with José Antonio Páez as President.

Administrative divisions
 Mérida Province
 Trujillo Province
 Caracas Province
 Barinas Province
 Barcelona Province
 Cumaná Province
 Margarita Province
 Guayana Province

See also 
Captaincy General of Venezuela
Venezuelan War of Independence
First Republic of Venezuela
Second Republic of Venezuela
Gran Colombia

Venezuelan War of Independence
Colonial Venezuela
Gran Colombia
Simón Bolívar
1810s in Venezuela
1817 in the Viceroyalty of New Granada
1818 in the Viceroyalty of New Granada
1819 in the Viceroyalty of New Granada
1819 in Gran Colombia
States and territories established in 1817
States and territories disestablished in 1819
1817 establishments in the Viceroyalty of New Granada
1819 disestablishments in the Viceroyalty of New Granada